Bryan J. Traynor is a neurologist and a senior investigator at the National Institute on Aging, and an adjunct professor at Johns Hopkins University. Dr. Traynor studies the genetics of human neurological conditions such as amyotrophic lateral sclerosis (ALS) and frontotemporal dementia (FTD). He led the international consortium that identified pathogenic repeat expansions in the C9orf72 gene as a common cause of ALS and FTD. Dr. Traynor also led efforts that identified other Mendelian genes responsible for familial ALS and dementia, including VCP, MATR3, KIF5A, HTT, and SPTLC1.

Dr. Traynor is a co-recipient of the Potamkin Prize for Research in Pick's, Alzheimer's, and Related Diseases for the discovery of the C9orf72 repeat expansions, and the Sheila Essay Award for his contributions to our understanding of ALS. He also received the NIH Director’s Award.

Education 
Dr. Traynor received his medical degree (MB, BCh, BAO, 1993), his Medical Doctorate (MD, 2000), and his Doctor of Philosophy (PhD, 2012) from University College Dublin. He also received his Master of Medical Science (MMSc) in drug development and clinical trial design from Harvard-MIT HST in 2004. He completed his neurology residency and fellowship at Brigham and Women’s Hospital and Massachusetts General Hospital.

Awards, prizes, and honors 

 2011 National Institute on Aging Director's Award
 2012 Derek Denny-Brown Award
 2012 Elected fellow of the American Neurological Association
 2012 National Institutes of Health Director's Award
 2013 Diamond Award
 2013 Sheila Essey Award
 2016 Potamkin Prize
 2018 Health and Life Sciences 50 Honoree
 2020 Elected fellow of the Royal College of Physicians of Ireland
2021 Elected fellow of the Royal College of Physicians (London)
2022 Elected member of the Association of American Physicians

Notable professional service 

 Chief, Neuromuscular Diseases Research Section, NIA, NIH
 Team leader, RNA Therapeutics Laboratory, NCATS, NIH
 Member, Health Genetics of Health and Disease NIH Study Section (2015-2021)
 Chair, Congressionally Mandated Department of Defense ALS Research Program (2015-2019)
 Co-chair, NIH Gene Therapy Task Force
 Member, Scientific Program Advisory Committee, American Neurological Association
 Editorial board member, Journal of Neurology, Neurosurgery and Psychiatry; Neurobiology of Aging; JAMA Neurology (2017-2021); Lancet eClinicalMedicine. 
 Associate editor, Brain

References

External links
 Bryan Traynor - Google Scholar

1969 births
Living people
Alumni of University College Dublin
Harvard Medical School alumni
Johns Hopkins University faculty
National Institutes of Health